A glycogen storage disease (GSD, also glycogenosis and dextrinosis) is a metabolic disorder caused by an enzyme deficiency affecting glycogen synthesis, glycogen breakdown, or glucose breakdown, typically in muscles and/or liver cells.

GSD has two classes of cause: genetic and acquired. Genetic GSD is caused by any inborn error of carbohydrate metabolism (genetically defective enzymes) involved in these processes.  In livestock, acquired GSD is caused by intoxication with the alkaloid castanospermine.

However, not every inborn error of carbohydrate metabolism has been assigned a GSD number, even if it is known to affect the muscles or liver. For example, Phosphoglycerate Kinase Deficiency (gene PGK1) has a myopathic form. (See Inborn Errors of Carbohydrate Metabolism for a full list of inherited diseases that affect glycogen synthesis, glycogen breakdown, or glucose breakdown.)

Types

Remarks:
 Some GSDs have different forms, e.g. infantile, juvenile, adult (late-onset).
 Some GSDs have different subtypes, e.g. GSD1a / GSD1b, GSD9A1 / GSD9A2 / GSD9B / GSD9C / GSD9D.
 GSD type 0: Although glycogen synthase deficiency does not result in storage of extra glycogen in the liver, it is often classified with the GSDs as type 0 because it is another defect of glycogen storage and can cause similar problems.
 GSD type VIII (GSD 8): In the past, Liver Phosphorylase-b Kinase Deficiency was considered a distinct condition, however it is has been classified with GSD type VI and GSD IXa1; it has been described as X-linked recessive inherited. GSD IX has become the dominant classification for this disease, grouped with the other isoenzymes of Phosphorylase-b Kinase Deficiency.
 GSD type XI (GSD 11): Fanconi-Bickel syndrome, hepatorenal glycogenosis with renal Fanconi syndrome, no longer considered a glycogen storage disease.
 GSD type XIV (GSD 14): Now classed as Congenital disorder of glycosylation type 1T (CDG1T), affects the phosphoglucomutase enzyme (gene PGM1). Phosphoglucomutase 1 Deficiency is both a glycogenosis and a congenital disorder of glycosylaiton. Individuals with the disease have both a glycolytic block as muscle glycogen cannot be broken down, as well as abnormal serum transferrin (loss of complete N-glycans).
 Lafora disease is considered a complex neurodegenerative disease and also a glycogen metabolism disorder.
 Polyglucosan Storage Myopathies are associated with defective glycogen metabolism
 (Not McArdle Disease, same gene but different symptoms) Myophosphorylase-a activity impaired: Autosomal dominant mutation on PYGM gene. AMP-independent myophosphorylase activity impaired, whereas the AMP-dependent activity was preserved. No exercise intolerance. Adult-onset muscle weakness. Accumulation of the intermediate filament desmin in the myofibers of the patients. Myophosphorylase comes in two forms: form 'a' is phosphorylated by phosporylase kinase, form 'b' is not phosphorylated. Both forms have two conformational states: active (R or relaxed) and inactive (T or tense). When either form 'a' or 'b' are in the active state, then the enzyme converts glycogen into glucose-1-phosphate. Myophosphorylase-b is allosterically activated by AMP being in larger concentration than ATP and/or glucose-6-phosphate. (See Glycogen phosphorylase§Regulation). 
 Unknown glycogenosis related to dystrophy gene deletion: patient has a previously undescribed myopathy associated with both Becker muscular dystrophy and a glycogen storage disorder of unknown aetiology.

Diagnosis

Treatment
Treatment is dependent on the type of glycogen storage disease. GSD I is typically treated with frequent small meals of carbohydrates and cornstarch, called modified cornstarch therapy, to prevent low blood sugar, while other treatments may include allopurinol and human granulocyte colony stimulating factor.

Epidemiology 
Overall, according to a study in British Columbia, approximately 2.3 children per 100,000 births (1 in 43,000) have some form of glycogen storage disease. In the United States, they are estimated to occur in 1 per 20,000–25,000 births. Dutch incidence rate is estimated to be 1 per 40,000 births.
While a Mexican incidence showed 6.78:1000 male newborns.

See also 

 Metabolic Myopathies
 Inborn Errors of Carbohydrate Metabolism

References

External links 

 IamGSD - International Association for Muscle Glycogen Storage Disease. A non-profit, patient-led international group encouraging efforts by research and medical professionals, national support groups and individual patients worldwide.
 IPA - International Pompe Association. (Pompe Disease is also known as GSD-II). A non-profit, federation of Pompe disease patient's groups world-wide. It seeks to coordinate activities and share experience and knowledge between different groups.
 EUROMAC - EUROMAC is a European registry of patients affected by McArdle Disease and other rare neuromuscular glycogenoses.
 CoRDS - Coordination of Rare Diseases at Sanford (CoRDS) is a centralized international patient registry for all rare diseases. They work with patient advocacy groups, including IamGSD, individuals and researchers.
 CORD - Canadian Organization for Rare Disorders (CORD) is a Canadian national network for organizations representing all those with rare disorders. CORD provides a strong common voice to advocate for health policy and a healthcare system that works for those with rare disorders.
 NORD - National Organization for Rare Disorders (NORD) is an American national non-profit patient advocacy organization that is dedicated to individuals with rare diseases and the organizations that serve them. 
 EURODIS - Rare Diseases Europe (EURODIS) is a unique, non-profit alliance of over 700 rare disease patient organizations across Europe that work together to improve the lives of the 30 million people living with a rare disease in Europe.

Inborn errors of carbohydrate metabolism
Hepatology
Rare diseases
Diseases of liver